Grand Ayatollah Sheikh Murtadha al-Ansari al-Tostari (1781–1864),, also transliterated as Mortaza Ansari Shushtari, was a Shia jurist who "was generally acknowledged as the most eminent jurist of the time." 

Ansari has also been called the "first effective" model or Marja of the Shia or "the first scholar universally recognized as supreme authority in matters of Shii law".

Life and studies
Al-Ansari was born in Dezful around 1781, the time the Qajar dynasty was establishing its power in Iran. He commenced his religious studies in Defzul, under the tutelage of his uncle, himself a notable scholar. At the age of twenty, he made Ziyarat with his father to Kerbala, Iraq, where he met Mohammad Mujtahid Karbala'i, the leader of the city's scholars. Ansari demonstrated considerable promise during a debate with the senior Mujtahid, who was so impressed that he induced his father to allow Ansari to continue his studies with them. Ansari studied in Kerbala for four years, until the city was besieged by Dawud Pasha and his rebels, causing the scholars of Kerbala and their students to flee to Baghdad and the shrine of al-Kazim. From there, Ansari returned to his homeland, where he quickly became restless and resolving to find teachers to continue his religious instruction. After about a year of traveling, he spent two years in Najaf studying under Musa al-Ja'fari and Sharif Mazandarani and a year in Najaf studying with Kashf ul-Ghita. Returning from a pilgrimage to Mashhad, Khurasan, he encountered Ahmad al-Naraqi, an authority in fiqh, usul al-fiqh and irfan, and – although Ansari was already a mujtahid in his own right when he left Karbala – studied with him for a further four years. After again traveling for a number of years, he returned to Najaf where he completed his studies under Kashf ul-Ghita and Muhammad Hasan Najafi (author of Jawahir ul-Kalam) and began teaching.

Religious leadership
When the last of the prominent scholars of the generation senior to Ansari died in 1849, Ansari was universally recognized as the 'most learned Mujtahid' (marja') in the Twelver Shi'ah community. His lessons in Fiqh and Usul al-fiqh became incredibly popular, attracting hundreds of students. Furthermore, it is estimated that 200,000 Tomans a year of Khums money was tithed to Ansari's base in Najaf "from all over the Islamic world". Despite this, Ansari lived humbly, generously provided stipends to his Islamic students with these funds, and this resulted in a confirmation of Najaf's standing as center of Shiah learning. In spite of the tremendous prestige attached to his position, Ansari lived the life of an ascetic. When he died, his two daughters were unable to pay for his funeral expenses from his inheritance. He rarely used his authority in the Shia community, seldom judging cases or giving fatawa.

From the beginning of the Oudh Bequest in 1850, Morteza Ansari along with Sayyid Ali Naqi al-Tabatabie transferred the bequest from India through agents. Morteza Ansari had devised a mode of distribution which included "junior mujtahids, low-ranking indigent ulama, Persian and Arab students, the custodians of the shrines, and the poor."

Intellectual contribution
According to Roy Mottahedeh, Ansari was celebrated for his piety and generosity and "more than that of any mullah leader of the past two centuries, his leadership celebrated his learning."  Through the expansion of rational devices in Usul al-fiqh, Ansari implicitly admitted the uncertainty of much of the sacred law. For this reason, he emphasized that only a learned Mujtahid could interpret scripture (i.e. the Qur'an and Hadith) and employ reason to produce legal doctrines. The rest of the community was obliged to follow (Taqlid) the doctrines of these legal scholars.

The author of some thirty books and treatises, his work is noted for its clarity and readability.  Most of his works center on Fiqh and Usul al-Fiqh. Of the former, his most important work is  the Makasib, a detailed exposition of Islamic Commercial Law, which is still taught today in the Hawza and has yet to be surpassed. Of the latter, his Fara'id ul-Usul remains an extremely important work. In it, he is credited with expanding the scope of the usul 'amaliyyah (practical principles, as opposed to semantic principles) in Shi'i jurisprudence. For this reason, Ansari is said to have laid the foundations of modern Twelver jurisprudence and his style – more than any other classical scholar – is imitated by the modern jurists.

See also
List of Islamic studies scholars
Qajar dynasty

Sources
Mottahedeh, Roy, The Mantle of the Prophet : Religion and Politics in Iran, One World, Oxford, 1985, 2000
Amin, Muhsin, Ayan ul-Shi'ah, Dar ul-Ta'aruf, Beirut, 1983 (Arabic)
Murata, S. ANṢĀRĪ, SHAIKH MORTAŻĀ B. MOḤAMMAD AMĪN. Encyclopædia Iranica: www.iranica.com (accessed 29.09.09)
Momen, An Introduction to Shi'ī Islam
Tabataba'i, Hossein Modarressi, An Introduction to Shi'i Law: A Bibliographical Study: London 1984

References

1781 births
1864 deaths
Iranian Arab Islamic scholars
People from Dezful
Iranian ayatollahs